A total of ten special routes of U.S. Route 71 exist, and another ten previously existed.

Alexandria bypass

Bypass US 71 is a controlled access highway at Alexandria, Louisiana. Its northern terminus is an interchange with Interstate 49 and US 71 and US 165 north of Alexandria. Its southern terminus is at an interchange with I-49 and US 71/US 167 south of Alexandria. It is signed at both the north and south termini as By-Pass US 71.

Waldron business route

Signed locally as Main Street, it was created in 1971 after US 71 was rerouted around the west side of town.

Fort Smith business loop

Its northern terminus is at I-40 and US 71 at Alma and its southern terminus is at I-540 and US 71 in south Fort Smith. US 71 Bus. passes through the towns of Alma, Van Buren and Fort Smith. One half mile south of I-40 at Alma, US 71 Bus. intersects US 64 and overlaps it to downtown Fort Smith and the junction of Arkansas Highway 22.

Within the city of Fort Smith, US 71 Bus. is commonly referred to by the names of Midland Boulevard (north of downtown), North 10th (one-way north-to-south) and North 11th Streets (one-way south-to-north) within downtown, Towson Avenue (south of downtown) and Zero Street (beginning at the intersection of US 271 and AR 255).

Northwest Arkansas business route

U.S. Route 71 Business (US 71B)  in Northwest Arkansas is a business route of US 71 that spans . 

US 71B begins at AR 112 (Garland Avenue) in Fayetteville, the southernmost principal city of the Northwest Arkansas region. The runs east as the J. William Fulbright Expressway with access to I-49 (as well as unsigned US 71 and US 62). US 71B passes the Washington Regional Medical Center on its way through uptown Fayetteville as a controlled-access highway, with exits signed for Gregg Avenue and College Avenue. The expressway ends and Highway 71B becomes College Avenue heading north, a four-lane divided highway. A junction with Joyce Boulevard is signed for access to I-49/US 62/US 62 via a jughandle intersection. Continuing north, US 71B passes the Northwest Arkansas Mall and Lake Fayetteville prior to entering Springdale.

Now known as Thompson Street, US 71B is a principal arterial in Springdale; passing the Springdale Country Club, intersecting Don Tyson Parkway, and crossing under the Arkansas and Missouri Railroad tracks before a junction with US 412 (Robinson Avenue). A concurrency begins northward, with US 412/US 71B keeping the Thompson Avenue designation. After a short distance, US 412 turns west onto Sunset Avenue, with US 71B continuing north as Thompson Street into a commercial area of Springdale. The road passes Murphy Park, Springdale High School, and junctions with Emma Avenue just west of the Springdale Poultry Industry Historic District. North of the junction with Emma Avenue, US 71B passes the Springdale Public Schools Administrative Offices and passes over the Northwest Arkansas Razorback Regional Greenway and Spring Creek before entering Benton County.

US 71B passes the Beasley Homestead (listed on the National Register of Historic Places) shortly before serving as the western terminus of a segment of Highway 264.

US 71B becomes Bloomington Street in Lowell as it continues north to AR 94 (New Hope Road). Entering Rogers, US 71B meets US 62/AR 12 and becomes Walnut Street and turns east. The route passes St. Mary's Hospital and Dixieland Mall and crosses to I-49 as it enters Bentonville.

History
US 71B was created by the Arkansas State Highway Commission on May 27, 1970. The designation followed the historic alignment of US 71 through Fayetteville, with the mainline US 71 designation moved to the bypass, which would become I-540 in 2000 and I-49 in 2014.

The highway was truncated in Bentonville from the former northern terminus (I-49, US 71 and AR 549) to an intersection of SW Regional Airport Boulevard and Walton Boulevard (colloquially known as Rainbow Curve) in 2018. In late 2019, most of the alignment in Fayetteville was transferred to city maintenance. The agreement allowed Fayetteville to construct a redesign without seeking ARDOT approval for the changes.

Major intersections

Pineville–Anderson business loop

Business Loop 71 is an alternate alignment of U.S. Route 71 in southwest Missouri. In 2007, it was extended along the former US 71 in Pineville after a new freeway section was built bypassing the town.

Savannah business loop

Maryville business loop

Business 71 is a former alignment of US 71 through Maryville, Missouri. Its northern terminus is an intersection with US 71 and US 136 north of Maryville.

Clarinda business loop

U.S. Route 71 Business is a former alignment of US 71 through Clarinda, Iowa. It begins at the junction of U.S. Route 71 and Iowa Highway 2 in southern Clarinda. Then, it follows 16th Street (Glenn Miller Avenue) towards downtown Clarinda. At Washington Street, US 71 Business meets Iowa 2 Business, and both routes continue east, eventually leaving Clarinda. East of Clarinda, US 71 Bus./IA 2 Bus. intersect US 71. US 71 Business ends while Iowa 2 Business continues south to complete its business loop.

Storm Lake business loop

U.S. Route 71 Business is a former alignment of US 71 in Storm Lake, Iowa. It begins at the junction of U.S. Route 71 and Iowa Highway 7. It follows Iowa 7 into Storm Lake along Lakeshore Drive, Flindt Drive, and Milwaukee Avenue. At Lake Avenue, US 71 Business turns north, leaving Iowa 7, where it eventually leaves Storm Lake. Near Truesdale, US 71 Bus. turns east and rejoins US 71.

Willmar business loop

U.S. Highway 71 Business (US 71 Bus.), which is completely concurrent with State Highway 23 Business (MN 23 Bus.) is a city-maintained business loop through the city of Willmar, Minnesota.

Former routes

I-49 business routes
On December 12, 2012, a portion of US 71 in Missouri was designated as Interstate 49. Four US 71 business routes that connected to the affected section of US 71 were redesignated as I-49 business routes:

Neosho, Missouri
Joplin, Missouri
Nevada, Missouri
Butler, Missouri

Alexandria business loop

Business 71 is a former alignment of US 71 in Alexandria. It followed the original routing of US 71 before the construction of Alexandria's current highway system. It began at an intersection with Lee Street and MacArthur Drive, and followed Lee Street. It turned west at an intersection with LA 1, following Bolton Avenue to US 165. It was deleted in the mid-1970s.

Joplin business loop

US 71 Bus. followed 32nd Street (Route FF), Main Street (Route 43), Broadway Street, St. Louis Avenue, Euclid Avenue, Utica Street, Florida Avenue, and Zora Street through downtown Joplin. From Main Street to Zora Street was originally the 1926 alignment of U.S Route 66. The part of US 71 that it looped off of is now I-49 Bus. The Joplin business loop was the first such route in Missouri; all others at the time were "city" routes.

Joplin alternate

Alternate US 71 was a former special route which provided an alternate route for US 71 between Carthage and Neosho, Missouri, bypassing Joplin. Both endpoints were junctions with US 71. This section of road from Fidelity to Carthage was originally Route 38, renumbered Route 38N in about 1930.

At Carthage, Alternate US 71 followed what is currently Route 571 to US 71 at what is now the intersection of Route 96/Route 571. When the freeway was built around Carthage, it ended at that the current exit of 71 at Route 96/571 and Business US 71.

In 1999, the Alternate 71 designation was deleted. The section north of Interstate 44 at Fidelity was redesignated US 71, with the former US 71 being designated Business 71. South of Interstate 44, it continues as Route 59 to U.S. Route 60. From there it followed US 60 to Neosho. Other than its endpoints, only two towns were located on the former highway: Fidelity, Missouri and Diamond, Missouri.

The road was originally assigned at Optional US 71 in 1932 and changed to Alternate US 71 in 1935.

Kansas City bypass

U.S. Route 71 Bypass was the original name for a highway that connected Harrisonville, Missouri, to just south of Platte City, where it rejoined US 71 near Kansas City International Airport. When I-29 was opened in the mid-1960s, it was renumbered Route 291.

At Lee's Summit, Missouri, it connects to I-470. It remains concurrent with the Interstate, until I-470 terminates at I-70. Route 291 continues to the north after its junction with I-70. The route has been rerouted several times, and has seen improvements over the years, and continues to be a major highway in eastern Jackson County, Missouri. In Platte and Clay Counties, it also is known as Cookingham Drive, and Mid Continent Trafficway.

St. Joseph business loop

Platte City bypass

References

71
U.S. Route 71
71
71
71
S71
71